Hanmin University was a university in Yeonsan, South Korea. In 2013 now-Ministry of Education granted its voluntary closure upon its request following the Ministry's audit report in 2012 which found its serious corruption and fraud. It officially closed in 2014.

References

External links
 Hanmin University's official homepage 

Universities and colleges in South Chungcheong Province
Defunct universities and colleges in South Korea
Educational institutions disestablished in 2014